Roger L. Attfield (born 28 November 1939 in Newbury, Berkshire, England) is a Canadian thoroughbred horse trainer and owner and an inductee of both the Canadian and United States horseracing Halls of Fame.

In his native England, Attfield had become an accomplished international-level equestrian competitor when he emigrated to Canada in 1970. Five years later he returned to the sport he loved and began working as a trainer of show jumping horses and eventually was offered the chance to train thoroughbred race horses. Instant success led to training opportunities for other owners including for Frank Stronach and Kinghaven Farms where he met with his greatest success.

A resident of Nobleton, Ontario, Roger Attfield won the Sovereign Award for Outstanding Trainer a record six times. Of the seven horses who have won the Canadian Triple Crown, three were trained by Attfield. A winner of twenty Canadian Triple Crown races, he holds or equals the record for most wins in each of the three races. In 2001, he set a record for most wins by a trainer in the Breeders' Stakes and in 2005 set the record for trainers by winning his fifth Prince of Wales Stakes. At the 2008 Queen's Plate, Attfield tied the record with Harry Giddings, Jr. as a trainer with eight wins. This was his first win as an owner. Overall he has trained nearly forty Champions, six of which were voted Canadian Horse of the Year.

As the trainer for Kinghaven Farms, in 1990 his stable was the leading money winner in North America. In the United States, his horses race at Gulfstream Park in Hallandale Beach, Florida, the Fair Grounds Race Course, in New Orleans, Louisiana and at the Keeneland Race Course in Lexington, Kentucky. Attfield trained horse has won a number of important U.S. Stakes races including the 1995 Wood Memorial and Gotham Stakes.

In 1999, Roger Attfield was inducted into the Canadian Horse Racing Hall of Fame and in 2006, he was nominated for induction into the U.S. National Museum of Racing and Hall of Fame. 

In 2012, Roger Attfield was inducted into the National Museum of Racing and Hall of Fame

In 2012, Roger Attfield was inducted into the Ontario Sports Hall of Fame.

References

External links
 Roger Attfield profile and statistics at Woodbine Entertainment
 Roger Attfield at the NTRA

1939 births
Living people
Animal sportspeople from Ontario
Canadian Horse Racing Hall of Fame inductees
United States Thoroughbred Racing Hall of Fame inductees
Canadian horse trainers
Canadian racehorse owners and breeders
English male equestrians
English emigrants to Canada
People from Newbury, Berkshire
Sportspeople from King, Ontario